Stranger in the House is a 1992 French crime drama directed by Georges Lautner and starring Jean Paul Belmondo. It is based on a novel by Georges Simenon, previously filmed by Henri Decoin in 1942.

The film marked the director's fifth and last collaboration with Belmondo, and was a commercial failure on its release. It had 413,794 admissions in France.

Plot

Cast 
 Jean-Paul Belmondo : Lawyer Jacques Loursat
 Renée Faure : Fine 
 Cristiana Réali : Isabelle Loursat
 Sébastien Tavel : Antoine Manu
 François Perrot : Commissioner Binet
 Georges Géret : Ange Brunetti 
 Hubert Deschamps : Beaupoil
 Sandrine Kiberlain : Marie Maitray
 Geneviève Page : Loursat's sister
 Jean-Louis Richard : Le Procureur général
 Guy Tréjan : Le bâtonnier
 Pierre Vernier : le président de la Cour d'assise
 Mario David : Pascal Abecassis's father
 Odette Laure : La patronne

References

External links

Stranger in the House at Le Film Guide

1992 films
Films based on Belgian novels
Films based on works by Georges Simenon
Films directed by Georges Lautner
French crime drama films
Remakes of French films
1990s French films